James L. Conway (born October 27, 1950 in New York City, U.S.) is an American film and television director, producer, and writer, studio executive, and novelist.

Movies Conway directed include The Boogens and Hangar 18.  Television series he worked on include The Magicians, Aquarius, Supernatural, Smallville, Psych, 90210, Charmed, Star Trek: Enterprise, Star Trek: Deep Space Nine, Star Trek: Voyager, Star Trek: The Next Generation, University Hospital, Burke's Law (the 1994 remake), Paradise, and Matt Houston.  Conway also directed the TV movies Last of the Mohicans and Incredible Rocky Mountain Race and the NBC mini-series Greatest Heroes of the Bible.

From 1996 to 2002, Conway served as Executive Vice President of Spelling Television, working on many television series including 7th Heaven, Melrose Place and Beverly Hills 90210.

Conway began writing novels in 2012.   His novels include Dead and Not So Buried (2012), Sexy Babe (2012) and In Cold Blonde (2013).

Select filmography

Director 
 The Orville
 90210
 Charmed
 Star Trek: Enterprise
 Star Trek: Deep Space Nine
 Kindred: The Embraced
 Star Trek: Voyager
 Star Trek: Borg
 Legend
 University Hospital
 Burke's Law
 Star Trek: The Next Generation
 Tour of Duty
 Hunter
 MacGyver
 Hotel
 Matt Houston
 Psych
 Smallville
 The Boogens
 Earthbound (1981)
 Beyond and Back (1978)
 In Search of Noah's Ark (1976)
 Hangar 18 (1980)

Producer 
 Charmed (co-executive producer) (season 4-season 8) (consulting producer) (seasons 3–4) 
 All Souls (consulting producer)
 Paradise
 In Search of Historic Jesus

Writer 
 University Hospital
 Burke's Law (developed by)
 Bodies of Evidence (creator)
 Paradise
 Matt Houston
 Hangar 18 (1980) (story)
 In Search of Noah's Ark (1976)

Star Trek TV directing
James L. Conway directed several Star Trek shows including for TNG (3), DS9 (7), Voyager (4), and Enterprise (4).
TNG
 "Justice" 
 "The Neutral Zone"
 "Frame of Mind"
DS9 
 "Duet" 
 "Necessary Evil" 
 "The Way of the Warrior" 
 "Little Green Men" 
 "Shattered Mirror" 
 "For the Cause" 
 "Apocalypse Rising" 
Voyager
 "The 37's" 
 "Persistence of Vision" 
 "Death Wish" 
 "Innocence" 
Enterprise
 "Broken Bow" 
 "Judgment" 
 "Damage" 
 "In a Mirror, Darkly"

References

External links
 

1950 births
Living people
20th-century American businesspeople
20th-century American male writers
20th-century American screenwriters
American male screenwriters
American male television writers
American television directors
American television writers
American video game directors
Businesspeople from New York City
Film directors from New York City
Film producers from New York (state)
Screenwriters from New York (state)
Television producers from New York City
Writers from New York City